Still Life with Peacocks is a c.1639 painting by Rembrandt, now in the Rijksmuseum Amsterdam.

Sources
http://hdl.handle.net/10934/RM0001.COLLECT.5220

Still life paintings
Paintings by Rembrandt
Paintings in the collection of the Rijksmuseum
1639 paintings
Paintings about death
Birds in art